Bruno Passaro (born 10 February 1989) is an Argentine Olympic show jumping rider. He competed at the 2016 Summer Olympics in Rio de Janeiro, Brazil, where he finished 10th in the team and was eliminated in the individual competition.

References

External links
 

Living people
1989 births
Argentine male equestrians
Equestrians at the 2016 Summer Olympics
Olympic equestrians of Argentina